Rocky Nook is a neighborhood in Kingston, Massachusetts.  The neighborhood sits on a small peninsula of land on Kingston Bay where the Jones River meets the Atlantic Ocean, near Duxbury, Massachusetts.  Rocky Nook was once a resort neighborhood with most of its houses originally built as summer cottages.  While many summer cottages remain to this day, most of the houses on Rocky Nook have long since been converted to year-round occupancy houses.

Populated coastal places in Massachusetts
Populated places in Plymouth County, Massachusetts